Conversation is communication among people.

Conversation(s) or The Conversation may also refer to:

Film and television
 The Conversation (film), a 1974 psychological thriller film
 Conversations, a 1995 film starring Meta Golding
 The Conversation (TV series), a 2020 American reality series
 "The Conversation" (Mad About You), a 1997 television episode

Literature
 Conversation (magazine), a UK poetry magazine
 A Conversation, a 2001 play by David Williamson

Music

Albums
 Conversation (album), by the Twinz, 1995
 Conversation, by Conte Candoli, 1973
 Conversations (Archie Shepp and Kahil El'Zabar album), 1999
 Conversations (Buddy Rich, Louie Bellson, Kenny Clare album), 1972
 Conversations (Eric Dolphy album), 1963
 Conversations (From a Second Story Window album), 2008 
 Conversations (Roses Are Red album) or the title song, 2004 
 Conversations (Sara Groves album) or the title song, 2001
 Conversations (Woman's Hour album) or the title song, 2014
 Conversations I, by Roscoe Mitchell, 2014
 Conversations II, by Roscoe Mitchell, 2014
 Conversations, by Brass Construction, 1983
 Conversations, by Alain Trudel and Yannick Nézet-Séguin, 2003
 The Conversation (Texas album) or the title song (see below), 2013 
 The Conversation (Tim Finn album), 2008
 The Conversation, by Cabaret Voltaire, 1994
 Conversations (Budjerah EP), by the Budjerah, 2022

Songs
 "Conversation", by Catfish and the Bottlemen from The Balance, 2019
 "Conversation", by Gary Numan from The Pleasure Principle, 1979
 "Conversation", by Joni Mitchell from Ladies of the Canyon, 1970
 "Conversation", by Morris Albert, 1977
 "Conversation", by Sabina Ddumba, 2019
 "Conversation", by Twice from Taste of Love, 2021
 "Conversations" (song), by Juice Wrld, 2020
 "Conversations", by Cilla Black, 1969
 "The Conversation" (Waylon Jennings and Hank Williams Jr. song), 1983
 "The Conversation" (Texas song), 2013
 "The Conversation", by Ivy from All Hours, 2011

News and radio
 Conversations (radio program), an Australian interview program
 Conversations Network, a podcast network 2002-2012
 The Conversation (website), a not-for-profit news and research site

Tech and computing
 Convoz, a social networking app
 Conversations (software), an XMPP client for Android

Other uses
 The Conversation (Matisse), a 1909 painting by Henri Matisse
 Richard Sharp (politician) (1759–1835), also known as "Conversation" Sharp, Whig intellectual

See also
 
 Conservation (disambiguation)
 Debate (disambiguation)
 Discussion page (disambiguation)